Mirza Ghalib commonly refers to Ghalib (1797–1869), a classical Urdu and Persian poet.

It may also refer to:

 Mirza Ghalib (film), a 1954 Urdu/Hindi Indian biographical film
 Mirza Ghalib (TV series), a 1988 Indian biographical television drama series
 Mirza Ghalib Street, a street in central Kolkata
 Mirza Ghalib College, a college in Bihar, India